To Each... is the second album and debut LP by English band A Certain Ratio, released in 1981 by record label Factory. It is sometimes considered the band's official first album. It was produced by A Certain Ratio and Martin Hannett.

The album spent twenty weeks in the UK Independent Chart, peaking at number 1.

Reception 

To Each... has been seen in a more negative light by critics in comparison to the band's early music. AllMusic wrote that, with the album, "the group dropped much of the bleak dance-punk of early material in place of what sounds like a shallow attempt to seize the baton dropped by gloom giants Joy Division after the death of Ian Curtis", calling the record "a bit too mired in its own misery to make an impression on listeners." Trouser Press wrote: "The studied tedium of To Each... [...] snuffed the [band's] early promise, as the band buried itself in dreary rhythms and astonishing self-indulgence." The Quietus echoed similar sentiments.

Track listing
 "Felch" – 3:45
 "My Spirit" – 2:28
 "Forced Laugh" – 5:53
 "Choir" – 2:51
 "Back to the Start" – 7:49
 "The Fox" – 3:46
 "Loss" – 3:23
 "Oceans" – 3:30
 "Winter Hill" – 12:45

References

External links 

 

1981 albums
A Certain Ratio albums
Albums produced by Martin Hannett
Factory Records albums